Joan Guillem Truyols Mascaró (born 11 November 1989) is a Spanish footballer who plays as a central defender for CD Badajoz.

Club career
Born in Palma de Mallorca, Balearic Islands, Truyols graduated from the youth academy of RCD Mallorca and made his debut with their reserves in the 2009–10 season, in Segunda División B. In February 2010, he was called to the first team by manager Gregorio Manzano for a La Liga match against CD Tenerife, as an injury replacement. 

On 4 May 2010, Truyols joined Segunda División side Villarreal CF B on a free transfer. He played his first game as a professional on 9 October, featuring the entire 3–0 away loss to Rayo Vallecano. 

Truyols scored his first goal for Villarreal B's on 7 April 2012, helping the hosts defeat Elche CF 2–0. Ahead of the following campaign, he was promoted to the main squad who also competed in the second tier. After being rarely used he was released, with the latter having achieved promotion.

On 19 July 2013, Truyols signed for Real Murcia. One year later, he returned to Mallorca. 

On 8 July 2016, Truyols moved abroad and joined Cypriot First Division club AEK Larnaca FC on a two-year contract. He returned to his country five years and 139 competitive appearances later, agreeing to a deal at CD Badajoz of the Primera División RFEF.

Career statistics

Honours
AEK Larnaca
Cypriot Cup: 2017–18
Cypriot Super Cup: 2018

References

External links

1989 births
Living people
Spanish footballers
Footballers from Palma de Mallorca
Association football defenders
Segunda División players
Segunda División B players
Primera Federación players
RCD Mallorca B players
Villarreal CF B players
Villarreal CF players
Real Murcia players
RCD Mallorca players
CD Badajoz players
Cypriot First Division players
AEK Larnaca FC players
Spanish expatriate footballers
Expatriate footballers in Cyprus
Spanish expatriate sportspeople in Cyprus